Paringa is a small town in the Riverland of South Australia. Paringa is famous for its vineyards, almond, citrus and stone fruit orchards, and the steel bridge with a span that can be raised to allow houseboats and paddlesteamers to pass underneath and across the Murray River to Renmark. At the 2006 census, Paringa had a population of 946.

Railway

The railway line from Tailem Bend was extended north to Paringa soon after it had reached the Brown's Well district, with the official opening on 3 October 1913. However it took another 14 years for the railway to cross the river, when the bridge and the railway to Renmark opened in January 1927. The railway eventually extended to Barmera by August 1928.

The historic Paringa Bridge was designed to carry a single railway line in the centre, with a road lane on each side of it. It has a total of six spans, including one lift span to allow river traffic to pass underneath. It was opened on 31 January 1927, enabling the railway to extend to Renmark. It is listed on the South Australian Heritage Register.

The railway closed December 1990 but the bridge continues to carry the Sturt Highway as part of the main road link between Adelaide and Sydney.

The town today
Paringa today is a satellite town to the much larger Renmark, 4 km upstream. It boasts a pub, general store, museum and antiques shop. It is a service centre for the large agricultural enterprises on the Murtho and Lindsay Point roads. There is a beautiful picnic area on the riverfront adjacent to the Bridge. The town had only one serving mayor, Mr Alan Eckermann, before the District Council of Paringa amalgamated with Renmark Council in July 1996 to form the now Renmark Paringa Council. Many new homes have been built in Paringa in recent years.

See also
List of crossings of the Murray River

References 

Towns in South Australia
Populated places on the Murray River
Riverland